Colorimetric capnography or colorimetric capnometry is a technique of detecting CO2 in exhaled gas using a color changing device. Such devices usually incorporate pH paper which is designed to change colour with the acidity of CO2. These devices are placed in the breathing system, portable, do not require electricity, change reversibly (breath-by-breath), and have a small amount of dead space. They are commonly used for neonatal intubations in an emergency to confirm placement of an endotracheal tube, and rule out accidental oesophageal intubation.

Devices include the Covidien Nellcor EasyCap or PediCap (manufactured by Medtronic), and the StatCO2, Mini StatCO2, Neo-StatCO2 (made by Mercury Medical).

The colour change of the EasyCap is from purple to yellow/gold, leading to the phrase '' or 'gold is good', as an aide-mémoire for successful tracheal intubation.

As these devices provide a qualitative colour change, rather than a quantitative number, their name has been questioned. Alternatives that have been suggested include "carbon dioxide colorimetry", "colorimetric carbon dioxide detection", and "chemical colorimetric analysis".

See also
 Capnography
 Metacresol purple
 Colorimetric analysis
 Colorimetry (chemical method)

References

External links
 LITFL.com information on capnography

Anesthesia